Lars Göran Ivar Hall (30 April 1927 – 26 April 1991) was a Swedish modern pentathlete who competed at the 1952 and 1956 Summer Olympics. He won the individual event at both Games and finished second with the Swedish team in 1952. In 1952 he became the first civilian Olympic champion in modern pentathlete.

For his achievements, Hall was awarded the Svenska Dagbladet Gold Medal in 1956 (shared with cross-country skier Sixten Jernberg).

References

1927 births
1991 deaths
Swedish male modern pentathletes
Olympic modern pentathletes of Sweden
Modern pentathletes at the 1952 Summer Olympics
Modern pentathletes at the 1956 Summer Olympics
Olympic gold medalists for Sweden
Olympic silver medalists for Sweden
Olympic medalists in modern pentathlon
World Modern Pentathlon Championships medalists
Medalists at the 1956 Summer Olympics
Medalists at the 1952 Summer Olympics
People from Karlskrona
Sportspeople from Blekinge County